Justin Morgan Wayne (born April 16, 1979) is an American former professional baseball pitcher, who played for the Florida Marlins of Major League Baseball for three seasons.

High school
Wayne is from Honolulu, Hawaii, and an alumnus of Punahou School. In high school, Wayne played baseball and soccer, and was a cross country runner. He was named to the All-Hawaii baseball team.

College
He was named by Collegiate Baseball to their first freshman All-American team and by The Sporting News as second team Freshman All-American. In 1998, he played collegiate summer baseball in the Cape Cod Baseball League for the Yarmouth-Dennis Red Sox. In his sophomore year, Wayne became a starting pitcher, and had a 10–0 record. His team finished in third place at the College World Series. In , Wayne was named co-Pac-10 Pitcher of the Year, with a 15–4 record and a 3.21 ERA, with Stanford reaching the finals of the College World Series. Wayne had 363 strikeouts while playing at Stanford, tied for first in that statistic.

Baseball career

Minor leagues
Wayne was first drafted by the Boston Red Sox in the 9th round of the 1997 Major League Baseball Draft, but did not sign. After being chosen 5th overall by the Montreal Expos in the 2000 Major League Baseball Draft, he decided to forego his senior season at Stanford to start his professional baseball career.

In , he ended his first full minor league season at Double-A for the Harrisburg Senators, where he went 9–2 with a 2.62 ERA in 14 starts for a losing team (.465 winning percentage).

Pitching at Harrisurg, where he spent most of the season, he went 5–2 with a 2.37 ERA in 17 starts, giving up only 6.75 hits per 9 innings.

Major leagues
In July 2002, Wayne was traded by the Expos with Graeme Lloyd, Mike Mordecai, Donald Levinski, and Carl Pavano to the Florida Marlins for Cliff Floyd, Wilton Guerrero, Claudio Vargas, and cash.

Wayne debuted in the major leagues in 2002 at the age of 22. That season, over  innings, opposing hitters recorded a .244 batting average against. He held batters to a .154 batting average in tie games. From 2002 to 2004, he made 26 appearances (eight starts), compiling a 6.13 ERA with 5–8 record, while recording 37 strikeouts and 36 walks over  innings pitched. With two outs and runners in scoring position, he held batters to a .048 average and .095 slugging percentage.

In April 2005, Wayne signed as a free agent with the Los Angeles Dodgers; he made four appearances for their Triple-A affiliate, the Las Vegas 51s, recording a 14.40 ERA. In May 2005, he signed as a free agent with the Kansas City Royals, but was released the following month before seeing any action.

Independent leagues
In August 2005, Wayne signed with the Newark Bears of the independent Atlantic League. In 10 appearances, Wayne pitched 18 innings, gave up 6 earned runs, walked 17, struck out 9, and had a 3.00 ERA with a 1–2 record. He held opponents to a .197 average.

Personal life

Wayne is Jewish, and majored in economics at Stanford.  He finished his degree in  years.

His brother, Hawkeye, played baseball at Columbia University and signed with the Seattle Mariners after being drafted in the 11th round of the 1999 Major League Baseball Draft. Their father, Jeffrey, played baseball at SUNY Buffalo.

After retiring from professional baseball, he spent  years in finance before focusing on the medical industry. He has continued in this field and is now a Managing Partner and Chief Operating Officer of SMART Lab, located in Palm Beach Gardens, Florida.

In 2018, Wayne received a two-year federal prison sentence at a minimum-security federal prison camp at Maxwell Air Force Base in Montgomery, Alabama, for an "insurance scam" involving Hawkeye, who received a 40-month sentence: "The brothers owned a testing lab. Prosecutors say a drug treatment center brought them patients' urine samples for unneeded testing. They billed insurance companies and then kicked back part of the proceeds."

References

Further reading
"The Jewish Boys of Summer- Jewish Players in 2005," 4/14/05

External links

Stanford bio
Jewish Virtual Library bio

1979 births
Living people
Albuquerque Isotopes players
American expatriate baseball players in Canada
Baseball players from Honolulu
Calgary Cannons players
Florida Marlins players
Harrisburg Senators players
Jewish American baseball players
Jewish Major League Baseball players
Jupiter Hammerheads players
Las Vegas 51s players
Major League Baseball pitchers
Newark Bears players
Portland Sea Dogs players
Punahou School alumni
Stanford Cardinal baseball players
Yarmouth–Dennis Red Sox players
All-American college baseball players
American sportspeople convicted of crimes
21st-century American Jews
American people convicted of fraud